Verwoerd is a surname originating from the Netherlands. Notable people with the surname include:

Betsie Verwoerd (1901–2000), spouse of the Prime Minister of South Africa from 1958 until the assassination of her husband Hendrik Verwoerd in 1966.
Hendrik Verwoerd (1901–1966), South African politician and Prime Minister
Melanie Verwoerd (born 1967), South African politician and diplomat
Wilhelm Verwoerd (born 1964), South African political philosopher

Afrikaans-language surnames
Surnames of Dutch origin